Aloisio Gonzaga (20 April 1494, Luzzara - 19 July 1549, Castel Goffredo) was an Italian condottiero.

Early life 
Usually known as Aloisio, other sources call him Aluigi, Loysio, Luigi or Luigi Alessandro. He was the sixth son of another condottiero, Rodolfo Gonzaga and his wife Caterina Pico.

Biography 
The lord of Castel Goffredo, Castiglione and Solferino, he was the founder of two cadet branches of the House of Gonzaga known as the "Castel Goffredo, Castiglione and Solferino Gonzagas" and "Castel Goffredo Gonzagas". - both branches went extinct in 1593. He backed the Holy Roman Emperor and its leader Charles V - Charles visited him at his residence in 1543.

He was one of the most important figures in the history of Castel Goffredo. He made it capital of his small Marquisate of Castel Goffredo and produced most of its town planning.

Personal life 
He was married to Caterina Anguissola and had three sons:
 Alfonso (1541 – 1592), second Marquis of Castel Goffredo; married in 1568 to Ippolita Maggi
 Caterina di Gonzaga-Castelgoffredo; married Carlo Emanuele Teodore Trivulzio, Conte di Melzo (d. 1605)
 Ippolita Trivulzio; married Honoré II, Prince of Monaco
 Ferrante (1544 – 1586), first Marquis of Castiglione; married Marta Tana di Santena da Chieri (1550-1605); had issue
 Orazio (1545– 1587), Marquis of Solferino.

References

Bibliography 
  Costante Berselli, Castelgoffredo nella storia, Mantova, 1978.
  Francesco Bonfiglio, Notizie storiche di Castelgoffredo, 2ª ed., Mantova, 2005, .
  Carlo Gozzi, Raccolta di documenti per la storia patria od Effemeridi storiche patrie, Tomo II, Mantova, 2003, .
  Massimo Marocchi, I Gonzaga di Castiglione delle Stiviere. Vicende pubbliche e private del casato di San Luigi, Verona, 1990.
  Piero Gualtierotti, Castel Goffredo dalle origini ai Gonzaga, 2008, Mantova.
  Giovanni Scardovelli, Luigi, Alfonso e Rodolfo Gonzaga marchesi di Castelgoffredo, Bologna, 1890.

1494 births
1549 deaths
16th-century condottieri
Aloisio
People from Reggio Emilia